Syri Television is a television channel in Albania launched on 2017. Syri.net started reporting in 2015, as a site close to the opposition and Critical of Ramas administration. Syri as a channel is considered to be close to the opposition. Also Syri Television has launched and a radio station transmitting in Albania.

References

External links 

 https://www.syri.net/

Television channels in Albania
2022 establishments in Albania